Lê Hiến Tông (chữ Hán: 黎憲宗, 10 August 1461 – 24 May 1504) was the 6th emperor of Vietnam's Lê dynasty reigning over Đại Việt from 1497 to 1504.

He promulgated the legal code of his father Lê Thánh Tông (1442–1497) in the Khâm định Việt sử Thông giám cương mục. His death in 1504 marked the beginning of the crisis in sixteenth-century Đại Việt which continued eighty-eight years until the Trịnh Lords drove the Mạc dynasty from the capital Thăng Long.

References

Vietnamese monarchs
1461 births
1504 deaths
15th-century Vietnamese monarchs
16th-century Vietnamese monarchs